Thomas Rutter (born 25 March 1977) is a former soccer defender.

Career
He started his career in Iceland with Fram Reykjavik, where he played five league games and helped Fram Reykjavik reach the Icelandic cup final, before joining USL Second Division franchise Wilmington Hammerheads in 2003. In his only season with the Hammerheads he helped win the club's one and only national championship. He left after one year to sign for the Utah Blitzz. At the Blitzz Tommy was a part of yet another national championship winning team in 2004. In 2005, Rutter transferred to the Harrisburg City Islanders, where he played for two seasons, making 17 league appearances in total.

References
Tommy Rutter profile at the Harrisburg City Islanders official website
 at Coastal Carolina University official website
 at the Star News website
 at Coastal Carolina University official website
 at the Deseret News Official website
 at the Deseret News Official website
 at the Deseret News Official website
 at Coastal Carolina University Official website
 the Sentinel Official Website
 at the Soccer America Official website
 Tiger Roar Official website
 Tiger Roar Official website
 at the Star News website

1977 births
Living people
English footballers
Tommy Rutter
Gloucester City A.F.C. players
Wilmington Hammerheads FC players
Penn FC players
Northwich Victoria F.C. players
English expatriates in Iceland
USL Second Division players
Utah Blitzz players
Expatriate footballers in Iceland
Association football defenders
English expatriate sportspeople in the United States
Expatriate soccer players in the United States
English expatriate footballers